Streptomyces viridochromogenes is a bacterium species in the genus Streptomyces.

S. viridochromogenes produces the natural herbicide bialaphos and the antibiotics streptazolin and avilamycin.

See also 
 List of Streptomyces species

References

External links 

 
Type strain of Streptomyces viridochromogenes at BacDive -  the Bacterial Diversity Metadatabase

viridochromogenes
Bacteria described in 1948